Argyrotaenia ochrochroa is a species of moth of the family Tortricidae. It is found in the Turks & Caicos.

References

Moths described in 1999
ochrochroa
Moths of the Caribbean